Fishergate Shopping Centre is a shopping centre in the city of Preston in Lancashire, England.

It opened in the 1980s as part of a development to revive the western end of Preston's main street, Fishergate. Its northern side is on Fishergate, and its southern side is built on the site of Butler Street Goods Yard, adjacent to the railway station. The car park, along with the station car park, occupies the remainder of the former goods yard and the site of the East Lancashire platforms of the station, which were demolished in the early 1970s.

It is the second largest shopping centre in Preston city centre, after St George's Shopping Centre (formerly The Mall). It was sold to Benson Elliot in August 2013, after former owner Agora Shopping Centres Fund was placed into administration.

Transport links 
Preston railway station is immediately next to the centre, as well as Preston Bus, and Stagecoach bus services along Fishergate. Preston Park & Ride also serves the centre.

Stores 
Stores in the Fishergate Centre include Debenhams, TJ Hughes, Primark, TK Maxx, Argos, Poundland and Sports Direct.

References

External links 
Official website

Shopping centres in Lancashire
Buildings and structures in Preston